Eretis camerona is a species of butterfly in the family Hesperiidae. It is found in Cameroon, the Democratic Republic of the Congo and western Uganda.

References

Butterflies described in 1937
Celaenorrhinini